Events from the year 1985 in El Salvador.

Incumbents
President: José Napoleón Duarte

Events
31 March – Salvadoran legislative election, 1985
19 June – 1985 Zona Rosa attacks
July – the United States offered a reward of US$100,000 for information leading to the conviction of those involved in the Zona Rosa attacks as part of the Combat Terrorism Act.
September – the Salvadoran government arrests four men, including Américo Mauro Araujo, a high-ranking Salvadoran Communist Party official, for their involvement in the Zona Rosa attacks.

Births

Deaths

 
1980s in El Salvador
Years of the 20th century in El Salvador